Microthamnion is a genus of green algae in the family Microthamniaceae.

References

External links

Microthamniales
Trebouxiophyceae genera
Trebouxiophyceae